The Prime Minister Cup was a Go competition.

Outline
The Prime Minister Cup ran from 1961 to 1981. It was used by the Nihon Ki-in The first 18 titles were decided in a knockout tournament. The last two years, the format was changed to a best-of-three match between finalists from a large knockout.

Past Winners & Runner-up's

Go competitions in Japan